The Finnish women's national under-18 ice hockey team is the national women's junior ice hockey team of Finland, which represents Finland at the International Ice Hockey Federation's Ice Hockey U18 Women's World Championship and other international U18 tournaments.

U18 Women's World Championship record

Team

Current roster
Roster for the 2023 IIHF U18 Women's World Championship.

Head coach: Mira KuismaAssistant coaches: Heikki Kemppainen, Juho Lehto, Aku Perala (goalkeeper)

World Championship player awards 
Best Defenseman
 2020: Nelli Laitinen

Best Forward
 2019: Elisa Holopainen

Best Goaltender
 2011: Isabella Portnoj
 2022: Emilia Kyrkkö

All-Star Team
 2013: Emma Nuutinen (F)
 2019: Elisa Holopainen (F), Nelli Laitinen (D)
 2020: Sanni Rantala (D)
 2021: Emilia Kyrkkö (G), Sanni Vanhanen (F)
 2023: Pauliina Salonen (F)

Top-3 Players on Team
 2008: Piia Räty (G), Linda Välimäki (F), Maiju Yliniemi (F) 
 2009: Susanna Airaksinen (G), Tiina Saarimäki (D), Tea Villilä (D) 
 2010: Isa Rahunen (D), Salla Rantanen (F), Susanna Tapani (F) 
 2011: Isabella Portnoj (G), Susanna Tapani (F), Saana Valkama (F) 
 2012: Anna Kilponen (D), Johanna Koivisto (D), Anni Rantanen (D)
 2013: Anna Kilponen (D), Emma Nuutinen (F), Eveliina Suonpää (G)
 2014: Anni Keisala (G), Marjut Klemola (D), Emmi Rakkolainen (F)
 2015: Sanni Hakala (F), Anni Keisala (G), Nelli Salomäki (F)
 2016: Sini Karjalainen (D), Petra Nieminen (F), Tiia Pajarinen (G) 
 2017: Sini Karjalainen (D), Jenniina Nylund (F), Jenna Silvonen (G) 
 2018: Sanni Ahola (G), Elisa Holopainen (F), Nelli Laitinen (D) 
 2019: Elisa Holopainen (F), Nelli Laitinen (D), Sanni Rantala (D)
 2020: Nelli Laitinen (D), Sanni Rantala (D), Kiira Yrjänen (F)
 2022: Oona Havana (F), Emilia Kyrkkö (G), Sanni Vanhanen (F)
 2023: Pauliina Salonen (F), Tuuli Tallinen (D), Sanni Vanhanen (F)

References

Notes

See also
 Finland women's national ice hockey team
 Naisten Liiga
 Women's ice hockey in Finland

Under
Women's national under-18 ice hockey teams